Richard Štochl (born 17 December 1975) is a Slovak handball goalkeeper and is currently playing for Eger.

References

External links
Official website

1975 births
Slovak male handball players
Slovak people of German descent
Living people
HC Motor Zaporizhia players
People from Michalovce
Sportspeople from the Košice Region